The international cricket season in 2005 lasted from April to September 2005.

Season overview

Rankings
The following are the rankings at the start of the season

April

ICC Intercontinental Cup

May

Pakistan in the West Indies

Bangladesh in England

June

Australia in England

NatWest Series

July

ICC Trophy

West Indies in Sri Lanka

Indian Oil Cup in Sri Lanka

August

Afro-Asian Cup

New Zealanders in Zimbabwe

Videocon Tri-Series

Bangladesh in Sri Lanka

September

India in Zimbabwe

See also

References
 The Cricinfo Archives 2005
 Cricinfo – ICC Intercontinental Cup 2005
 CricketArchive
 ICC Trophy 2005 – official site powered by CricketEurope
 International Cricket Council

2005 in cricket